Chang Kai-chen was the defending champion, but chose not to participate.

Sara Errani won the title, defeating Guo Hanyu in the final, 6–1, 6–0.

Seeds

Draw

Finals

Top half

Bottom half

References
Main Draw

Suzhou Ladies Open - Singles